The Geoffrey Bellmaine Stakes is a Melbourne Racing Club Group 3 Thoroughbred horse race for mares four years old and older, held with set weights with penalties conditions, over a distance of 1200 metres at Caulfield Racecourse in Melbourne, Australia in February. Prize money for the race is A$200,000.

History
The race has been held on the same race card as the Group 1 C F Orr Stakes since 2003.

Name
2000 - Hyderabad Race Club Plate
2001 - Hyderabad Race Club Stakes
2002 - Hyderabad Race Club Handicap
2003 -  Moduline Plate 
2004–2011 - Hyderabad Race Club Stakes
2012–2015 - Geoffrey Bellmaine Stakes
2016 - Bellmaine Stakes

Distance
 2000–2001 - 1200 metres
 2002 - 1600 metres
 2003 onwards - 1200 metres

Grade
 2001–2006 - Listed race
 2007 onwards - Group 3

Winners

 2023 - Wrote To Arataki 
 2022 - Probabeel 
 2021 - Probabeel 
 2020 - Sylvia's Mother 
 2019 - Princess Of Queens
 2018 - Prussian Vixen
 2017 - Prussian Vixen
 2016 - Tuscan Sling
 2015 - Tycoon Tara	
 2014 - A Time For Julia
 2013 - There's Only One
 2012 - Psychologist
 2011 - Beaded
 2010 - Velocitea
 2009 - Annesong
 2008 - Lucky Diva
 2007 - Coniston Gem
 2006 - Beautiful Gem
 2005 - Glamour Puss
 2004 - Given
 2003 - Skewiff
 2002 - Blue Marwina
 2001 - Typhoon Billie
 2000 - Londolozi

See also
 List of Australian Group races
 Group races

References

Horse races in Australia